Quantity:

This album includes 14 songs produced by Stan Kenton Performing Jazz genre. Which was released in the 1963

Definition of Bossa nova:

bossa nova, (Portuguese: “new trend”) Brazilian popular music that evolved in the late 1950s from a union of samba (a Brazilian dance and music) and cool 

Artistry in Bossa Nova is an album by the Stan Kenton Orchestra performing old and new compositions arranged in a bossa nova style recorded and released by Capitol Records in 1963.

Reception

The Allmusic review by Scott Yanow noted "Although one might consider this project to be an example of Kenton jumping on the bandwagon (since the bossa nova fad was at its peak at the time), the music is quite enjoyable".

Track listing
All compositions by Stan Kenton except where noted.
 "Artistry in Rhythm" - 2:48
 "Opus in Chartreuse"  (Gene Roland) - 3:10
 "Interlude" (Kenton, Bob Russell) - 2:28
 "Kentonova" - 3:53
 "Eager Beaver" - 3:32
 "Concerto to End All Concertos" - 3:15
 "Brasilia" - 2:21
 "Painted Rhythm" - 3:25   
 "Opus in Pastels" - 3:01
 "Jump for Joe" (Roland) - 3:28   
 "Loco-Nova" - 2:50   
 "Artistry in Bossa Nova" (Pete Rugolo) - 2:49
Recorded at Capitol Studios in Hollywood, CA on April 16, 1963 (tracks 3, 6 & 7) and April 17, 1963 (tracks 1, 2, 4, 5 & 8-12).

Personnel
Stan Kenton - piano, arranger, conductor
Bob Behrendt, Bud Brisbois, Conte Candoli, Bob Rolfe, Dalton Smith - trumpet
Gil Falco, Bob Fitzpatrick, Kent Larsen  - trombone
Jim Amlotte, - bass trombone
Dave Wheeler - bass trombone, tuba
Joe Burnett, Dwight Carver, Bob Grull, Tony Scodwell - mellophone
Gabe Baltazar - alto saxophone
Ray Florian, Steve Marcus - tenor saxophone
Jack Nimitz - baritone saxophone
Joel Kaye - baritone saxophone, bass saxophone
Don Bagley - bass 
Dee Barton - drums 
Larry Bunker, Frank "Chico" Guerrero - Latin percussion

References

Stan Kenton albums
1963 albums
Capitol Records albums
Albums conducted by Stan Kenton
Albums recorded at Capitol Studios
Albums produced by Lee Gillette